Garbiñe Muguruza and María Teresa Torró Flor were the defending champions, but decided not to participate.
Monica Niculescu and Klára Zakopalová won the title, defeating Lisa Raymond and Zhang Shuai in the final 6–2, 6–7(5–7), [10–8].

Seeds

Draw

Draw

References
 Draw

2014 Hobart International
Hobart International – Doubles